Tamnar is a town and a Gram Panchayat in Raigarh district in the Indian state of Chhattisgarh.

Geography and Climate 
Tamnar is a small town, situated in the
Raigarh District of Chhattisgarh. It is located
in the Tamnar Tehsil of Chhattisgarh, at a
distance of 48.9 km from the city of Raigarh.
It lies at an elevation of 215 m above sea
level and is also a passing point of the Kelo River.

Demographics 
Tamnar comes under low population area and 4474 people live in this town.

Economy 
Tamnar has a big power plant made by Jindal Power Ltd and 4 col-mines. It has become main income source for many people. Although, many people go to company for work but 70% people still do agricultural work. Tamnar has a branch of State Bank of India in the center of town.
and 4 col-mines

Attractions
Main attractions of TAMNAR are Satyanarayan Kund, Banjari Mandir, Gaytri Mandir, Herbal Eco Park, Panchamukhi Hanuman Mandir, Jagannath Temple, Van Ganga, Ghateshwari Mandir, Moushi Mandir, Keslapath etc. Te best thing about keslapath is that a lot of goat were donated to Keslapath Dewta on every Saturday. TURRI is also very famous for its picnic spot. Perawatta is beautiful small waterfall like place surrounded by atmost greenery is a place where u can enjoy ur day, especially it is mostly visited during rainy season as the beauty is refined during rainy days.

Education 
Tamnar is a small town so in this town not a high education rank.but in spite of resources many students are coming out from village.
But in the tamnar has many schools  And one college  Bilaspur University Tamnar for college education.
In the tamnar many village students are going for study. Ex. amlidhodha, mohloi, hamirpur, etc. And tamnar is the popular study center for villages student and tamnars student. But some student are going to raigarh for better study.

School 
1. St. Ann's Higher Secondary School Basanpali (Tamnar)

2. Adarsh Gramya Bharti Vidya Mandir Tamnar

3. Govt. Boys High School

4. Sahyog vidya mandir Tamnar

5. Govt. Girls High school barbhata chowk

6. Saraswati Sishu Mandir Tamnar

7. Kanya Shala Tamnar

8. O.p Jindal school Urjanagar(
9. Laxmi Devi Public School Kasdol Tamnar

References

Cities and towns in Raigarh district